Gabrielle is a daytime talk show which aired from 1995 to 1996. Gabrielle Carteris was offered by 20th Television after wanting a career change and was offered a gig of her own talk show.

References

1995 American television series debuts
1996 American television series endings
1990s American television talk shows
First-run syndicated television programs in the United States